Carrie Beth Cabelka (born April 27, 1976) is an American political advisor serving as Assistant Secretary of State for Administration. Cabelka assumed office on August 20, 2019, succeeding John W. Dinkelman.

Early life and education 
Born in California and raised in Michigan, Cabelka earned a Bachelor of Arts degree in history and political science from Miami University in Oxford, Ohio.

Career 

After graduating from college, Cabelka worked on the campaign of Spencer Abraham. After Abraham was elected to the United States Senate, Cabelka worked as an aide in his office. Cabelka then joined the Bush–Cheney transition team. During the Bush administration, Cabelka served in the White House Office of Presidential Personnel and International Trade Administration. Cabelka later served as a liaison at the United States Office of Personnel Management, and later to the Secretary of State from 2005 to 2007.

After the end of the Bush administration, Cabelka worked as a program manager at Maximus Inc., an outsourcing company that provides health services for government agencies. After the election of Donald Trump, Cabelka was selected to serve as the White House Liaison to the United States Department of State. In July 2019, it was announced that Cabelka would serve as Assistant Secretary of State for Administration. She assumed office on August 20, 2019.

References 

1976 births
Living people
People from San Diego County, California
People from Michigan
Miami University alumni
George W. Bush administration personnel
United States Department of State officials
United States Assistant Secretaries of State
Trump administration personnel